This is a list of things named after prime ministers of the United Kingdom. Many different things have been named after people who have been Prime Minister of the United Kingdom, including places, roads, parks, schools, ships, pubs, mountains and buildings.

Robert Walpole

Earl of Wilmington

Lord Rockingham

William Pitt the Elder

Duke of Grafton

Duke of Portland

William Pitt the Younger

Earl of Liverpool

George Canning

Duke of Wellington

Charles Grey, 2nd Earl Grey

Lord Melbourne

Robert Peel

Lord Palmerston

William Gladstone

Archibald Primrose, 5th Earl of Rosebery

Arthur Balfour
Balfour Declaration
Balfour Declaration of 1926
Arthur Balfour Conservative Club, Aberbargoed
Balfour Street, Jerusalem
Lord Arthur James Balfour Street, Ashdod
Lord Arthur James Balfour Street, Tel Aviv

David Lloyd George

Stanley Baldwin

Winston Churchill

Clement Attlee

Anthony Eden
Anthony Eden hat
Eden Court, Leamington Spa
Sir Anthony Eden Way, Warwick

Margaret Thatcher

John Major

Tony Blair
Tonibler
Blairism
Blatcherism
Tony Blair Institute for Global Change
Tony Blair Faith Foundation
Tony Blair Associates
Bush–Blair 2003 Iraq memo
Blair Babes
Blair–Brown deal
Tony's Cronies

Gordon Brown
Brownism
Blair–Brown deal
Brown Bottom

Boris Johnson
Boris Bikes
Boris Bus, for the New Routemaster.
Boris Island, for London Britannia Airport
Boris Bridge, for the Irish Sea Bridge.
Boris Johnson Street, Fontanka, Ukraine.

Liz Truss 

 Trussonomics

References

United Kingdom
 
United Kingdom politics-related lists